John Edwards (1786June 26, 1843) was an Anti-Masonic and Whig member of the U.S. House of Representatives from Pennsylvania.

Biography
John Edwards (granduncle of John E. Leonard) was born in Glen Mills, Pennsylvania.  He studied law, was admitted to the bar in 1807 and commenced practice in Chester, Pennsylvania.  He was deputy attorney general for Delaware County, Pennsylvania, in 1811.  He moved to West Chester, Pennsylvania, in 1825 and shortly thereafter engaged in the manufacture of iron and later of nails near Glen Mills, Pennsylvania.

Edwards was elected as an Anti-Masonic candidate to the Twenty-sixth Congress and reelected as a Whig to the Twenty-seventh Congress.  After his time in congress, he resumed his former manufacturing pursuits, and died on his estate near Glen Mills in 1843.  Interment in the Friends' (Hicksite) Cemetery of the Middletown Friends Meetinghouse in Middletown Township, Delaware County, Pennsylvania.

Sources

The Political Graveyard

1786 births
1843 deaths
19th-century American lawyers
19th-century American politicians
Anti-Masonic Party members of the United States House of Representatives from Pennsylvania
Burials in Pennsylvania
Pennsylvania lawyers
People from Delaware County, Pennsylvania
Whig Party members of the United States House of Representatives from Pennsylvania